Philippe Morier-Genoud (born 2 March 1944) is a French theatre and film actor.

Selected filmography
 Confidentially Yours (1983)
 Au revoir les enfants (1987)
 Cyrano de Bergerac (1990)
 Safe Conduct (2002)
 A Private Affair (2002)
 Streamfield, les carnets noirs (2010)

Decorations 
 Chevalier of the Legion of Honour (2015)

References

Living people
French male film actors
French male stage actors
Knights of the Ordre national du Mérite
Chevaliers of the Légion d'honneur
1944 births